Peter Randt (born 24 January 1941) is a former East German male handball player. He was a member of the East Germany national handball team, playing 6 matches. He was part of the  team at the 1972 Summer Olympics. On club level he played for SC DHfK Leipzig.

Randt also played for the silver medal-winning national team in the 1970 World Men's Handball Championship in France, which lost in the final to Romania, 13–12.   He was in the 1967 World Men's Handball Championship team in Sweden, which was eliminated after the first round.

References

1941 births
Living people
East German male handball players
Handball players at the 1972 Summer Olympics
Olympic handball players of East Germany
People from Güstrow
Sportspeople from Mecklenburg-Western Pomerania